The Mountainbike Competition at the 2003 Pan American Games in Santo Domingo, Dominican Republic was held on 10 August 2003.

Results

Men's Cross Country

Women's Cross Country

See also
 Cycling at the 2004 Summer Olympics – Men's cross-country
 Cycling at the 2004 Summer Olympics – Women's cross-country

References
cyclingnews

M
2003
2003 in mountain biking